Clare Bailey (born 18 June 1970) is a Northern Irish politician who was the Leader of Green Party Northern Ireland from November 2018 to August 2022, and was the Deputy Leader of the Green Party from 2014 to 2017. Bailey was a Member of the Legislative Assembly (MLA) for Belfast South from 2016 to 2022.

Early life
Bailey was born in Clonard on the Lower Falls. She was one of the first 28 pupils of Lagan College, Northern Ireland's first integrated school. She later attended Queen's University Belfast.

Political career
Bailey identifies as pro-choice and a feminist. She was a client escort for women accessing healthcare advice at the Belfast Marie Stopes Clinic, enduring assault and intimidation from anti-abortion protesters. She has also worked supporting survivors of sexual violence and abuse.

In 2011 she stood unsuccessfully for the Laganbank district electoral area on Belfast City Council, narrowly missing a seat and coming 6th in a 5-seat district electoral area.

Bailey was elected as an MLA in Belfast South at the 2016 Assembly election. She nearly trebled the Green Party vote in the area compared to the previous Assembly election. Political commentators considered her election so unlikely that pundit Alex Kane said he would sing on the steps of the Assembly if Bailey was elected. Kane kept this promise and was filmed by the BBC doing so.

Bailey was re-elected to the Assembly in 2017.

She served as the Greens' Deputy Leader until 2017. In November 2018, Bailey became Leader of the Green Party.

In May 2019, Bailey ran unsuccessfully for European Parliament, receiving 12,471 votes which placed her 7th and increased the Greens' share of the vote by 0.48%.

In March 2022, Bailey secured cross-party support and successfully passed a bill through the Assembly creating 'safe zones' around abortion clinics to prevent the harassment of women. Bailey also proposed her own Climate Change Bill, and ultimately succeeded in strengthening Minister Edwin Poots' eventual Climate Change Bill. Bailey said that Poots' Bill "simply wouldn’t be in place" if it wasn't for the Green Party proposing a climate bill in the first place.

Speaking ahead of the 2022 Northern Ireland Assembly election, Bailey highlighted the Green Party's outsized influence in the Assembly by noting that the Greens' policies, previously dismissed by rival parties, were now appearing in their manifestos. In the election, she lost her seat to Lord Mayor of Belfast Kate Nicholl of the Alliance Party.

After the 2022 Northern Ireland Assembly election, Bailey chose not to stand for re-election as leader. She was succeeded by Mal O'Hara in August 2022.

References

1970 births
Living people
Green Party in Northern Ireland MLAs
Northern Ireland MLAs 2016–2017
Feminists from Northern Ireland
Female members of the Northern Ireland Assembly
Northern Ireland MLAs 2017–2022
Leaders of political parties in Northern Ireland